Psalm 150 is the 150th and final psalm of the Book of Psalms, beginning in English in the King James Version: "Praise ye the . Praise God in his sanctuary". In Latin, it is known as "Laudate Dominum in sanctis eius". In Psalm 150, the psalmist urges the congregation to praise God with music and dancing, naming nine types of musical instruments. 

In most versions of the Bible, the Book of Psalms has 150 psalms and Psalm 150 is the final one. However, that is not the case in the Eastern Orthodox and Syriac Orthodox canons, which have 151 and 155 psalms respectively.

The Jerusalem Bible describes Psalm 150 as a "final chorus of praise". It is a hymn psalm, forming a regular part of Jewish, Catholic, Lutheran, Anglican and other Protestant liturgies. As one of the Laudate psalms, it was part of the Lauds, a Catholic morning service. It has been paraphrased in hymns and has often been set to music. Composers have written settings throughout the centuries, in various languages, including Bruckner's German setting, Psalm 150, from 1892; the third movement of Stravinsky's Symphony of Psalms in Latin; and the third movement, Tehillim, in Hebrew in the Gloria by Karl Jenkins in 2010.

Background and themes
Like Psalms 146, 147, 148, and 149, Psalm 150 begins and ends in Hebrew with the word Hallelujah. Further, David Guzik notes that each of the five books of Psalms ends with a doxology (i.e., a benediction), with Psalm 150 representing the conclusion of the fifth book as well as the conclusion of the entire work, in a more elaborate manner than the concluding verses which close the other books, e.g. Psalm 41:13:Blessed be the Lord God of Israel, From everlasting to everlasting! Amen and Amen.

Matthew Henry notes that this final psalm parallels the first psalm in that they have the same number of verses.

According to the Kabbalah, the ten expressions of praise in this psalm correspond to the ten sefirot (divine emanations). Additionally, the word hallel (praise) can be found thirteen times in the psalm, correlating to the Thirteen Attributes of Mercy. The directive hallelu ("you praise") is seen twelve times, corresponding to the twelve new moons that occur in a Hebrew calendar year. When this psalm is recited during the Jewish prayer service (see below), verse 6 is repeated, adding a thirteenth expression of hallelu which alludes to the thirteenth new moon in a leap year.

Psalm 150 names nine types of musical instruments to be used in praise of God. While the exact translation of some of these instruments is unknown, the Jewish commentators have identified the shofar, lyre, harp, drum, organ, flute, cymbal, and trumpet. Saint Augustine observes that all human faculties are used in producing music from these instruments: "The breath is employed in blowing the trumpet; the fingers are used in striking the strings of the psaltery and the harp; the whole hand is exerted in beating the timbrel; the feet move in the dance".

Text

Hebrew Bible version

The following is the Hebrew text of Psalm 150:

King James Version
Praise God in his sanctuary: praise him in the firmament of his power.
 Praise him for his mighty acts: praise him according to his excellent greatness.
 Praise him with the sound of the trumpet: praise him with the psaltery and harp.
 Praise him with the timbrel and dance: praise him with stringed instruments and organs.
 Praise him upon the loud cymbals: praise him upon the high sounding cymbals.

Verse 6
Let every thing that hath breath praise the LORD. Hallelujah.
According to the Midrash, the Hebrew words kol ha-neshamah, which literally mean "Let all souls [praise God]", can also be vowelized as kol ha-neshimah, "Let every breath [praise God]". The Midrash expounds, "For each and every breath a person takes, he must praise God". The words ha-neshamah "most commonly denotes the breath of man; but it may include all animals", says Alexander Kirkpatrick, noting that "not priests and Levites only but all Israel, not Israel only but all mankind, not all mankind only but every living thing, must join in the chorus of praise".

Uses

Judaism 
Psalm 150 is the fifth of five consecutive psalms (Psalms 146, 147, 148, 149, and 150) which comprise the main part of Pesukei dezimra in the daily morning service. When recited in this prayer, verse 6 is repeated, indicating the conclusion of the main part of Pesukei dezimra. This repetition of the final verse, which concludes the entire Book of Psalms, mirrors the way the final verse at the end of a Book of the Torah is repeated during the Torah reading in the synagogue.

The entire psalm is recited during the Shofarot section of the Mussaf Amidah on Rosh Hashanah, and during Kiddush Levanah.

Verse 3 is included in a piyyut recited by the Hazzan and congregation on the first day of Rosh Hashanah when that day coincides with a Shabbat.

In Perek Shirah, an ancient Jewish text that ascribes scriptural verses to each element of creation as their way of praising God, the spider says verse 5 of this psalm and the rat says verse 6.

Psalm 150 is one of the ten psalms of the Tikkun HaKlali of Rebbe Nachman of Breslov.

Catholicism

Psalm 150 is one of the Laudate psalms, the others being Psalm 148 (Laudate Dominum) and Psalm 149 (Cantate Domino). All three were traditionally sung, in the sequence 148, 149 and 150, during Lauds, a morning service from the canonical hours.

Musical settings
With its focus on musical instruments, Psalm 150 has been called "the musicians' psalm", and also "praise beyond words". It has inspired many composers to musical settings, from paraphrasing hymns to use in extended symphonic works:  

 Jan Dismas Zelenka – motet Chvalte Boha silného ZWV 165 (Psalm 150 according to the Kralice Bible) for bass, instruments & continuo in G major (c. 1725)
 Johann Sebastian Bach – motet Singet dem Herrn ein neues Lied, verses 2 and 6 (c. 1727)
 Robert Schumann – Psalm 150 for choir and orchestra (1822) = RSW:Anh:I10. (bearing his own note: “oldest completely finished work”)
 Felix Mendelssohn – in Lobgesang, Op. 52 (Alles, was Odem hat, lobe den Herrn)
 Anton Bruckner — Psalm 150 Halleluja. Lobet den Herrn in seinem Heiligthum WAB 38 (1892)
 Cesar Franck – Psalm 150
 Zoltán Kodály – Geneva Psalm 150
 Louis Lewandowski – Halleluyah (Psalm 150)
 Edmund Rubbra – Three Psalms, Op. 61 (No. 3)
 Charles Villiers Stanford – Psalm 150: O praise God in his holiness
 Igor Stravinsky – Symphony of Psalms, third movement
 Duke Ellington – "Praise God and Dance" in the Second Sacred Concert
 Benjamin Britten – Psalm 150, Op. 67 (1962) for two-part children's voices and instruments (for upper voices)
 Bertold Hummel – Psalm 150 (Hallelujah. Laudate Dominum)
 Jimmy Webb – "Psalm One-Five-O" on Words and Music
 Charles Ives – Psalm 150
 Alan Hovhaness - set portions, along with portions of Psalms 33 and 146, in his cantata Praise the Lord with Psaltery (1969)
 Ernani Aguiar – Salmo 150 (1975)
 P.O.D. – Psalm 150 on The Fundamental Elements of Southtown
 J. Moss – Psalm 150 on The J Moss Project
 Ronald Corp – "Psalm 150, O Praise God in His Holiness" (2007). He also set the Latin version of the same text in Laudate Dominum (2011).
 Karl Jenkins – The Psalm: Tehillim 150 in Gloria, movement 3, 2010
 VaShawn Mitchell – "Psalm 150" on Created4This (2012)

Stamps 
Joyous Festivals 5716 Stamps of Israel, with the inscriptions on tab from Psalm 150

Citations

Sources

External links 

 Psalms Chapter 150 text in Hebrew and English, mechon-mamre.org
 
 
 Text of Psalm 150 according to the 1928 Psalter
 Hallelujah! Praise God in his holy sanctuary; give praise in the mighty dome of heaven. Text and footnotes, usccb.org United States Conference of Catholic Bishops
 Psalm 150 / Let everything that has breath praise the Lord. Church of England
 Psalm 150 at biblegateway.com
Hymnary.org, Hymns for Psalm 150
Hebrew text, translation, transliteration, recorded melodies in the Zemirot Database

150
Pesukei dezimra
Siddur of Orthodox Judaism